Monique Chandler-Waterman is an American politician who has served as a member of the New York State Assembly for the 58th district since May 2022. A member of the Democratic Party, Chandler-Waterman won her seat in a special election to fill the seat vacated when N. Nick Perry was appointed U.S. ambassador to Jamaica.

Biography 
Chandler-Waterman is a daughter of Jamaican and Barbadian immigrants. She attended PS 135, and later received bachelor's and master's degrees in business administration from Berkeley College and Metropolitan College of New York, respectively. She is married to Eric Waterman, with whom she has four children.

References 

21st-century American women politicians
21st-century American politicians
Democratic Party members of the New York State Assembly
Women state legislators in New York (state)
Year of birth missing (living people)
Living people